Hurricane Uleki, also referred as Typhoon Uleki, was a long-lived tropical cyclone in August–September 1988 that had minimal effects on land. Originating from a disturbance in the Intertropical Convergence Zone in late-August, Uleki was identified as a tropical depression well to the southeast of Hawaii on August 28. Steady organization ensued as it moved west, becoming a tropical storm on August 30 and a hurricane on August 31. Thereafter, Uleki stalled for two days to the southwest of Hawaii, resulting in heavy surf across the state. The dangerous swells killed two people on Oahu.

Unfavorable environmental conditions caused weakening of the hurricane by September 4 as it resumed a west-northwest course away from Hawaii. Conditions later became favorable and Uleki acquired winds of 105 mph (165 mph) on September 7, constituting its secondary peak. The hurricane crossed the International Date Line on September 8 and was reclassified as typhoon. Remaining well away from land, the cyclone steadily weakened to a tropical storm by September 12. Gradually turning north and later east, the degrading cyclone transitioned into an extratropical cyclone four days later and ultimately dissipated on September 17 near the International Date Line.

Meteorological history 

In late-August 1988, increased convective activity was noted along the Intertropical Convergence Zone by forecasters at the Central Pacific Hurricane Center (CPHC). An area of low pressure subsequently developed within this disturbance and was designated as Tropical Depression One-C at 12:00 UTC on August 28. Steady intensification ensued over the following day with the system attaining gale-force winds by 18:00 UTC on August 29, at which time it was assigned the name Uleki. Thereafter, Uleki underwent a sudden period of rapid intensification and achieved major hurricane status later that day. After reaching this strength, Uleki's forward motion gradually lessened and eventually almost ceased altogether on September 1 as upper-level steering currents collapsed.

With the hurricane situated to the southwest of the Hawaiian Islands, Hurricane Hunters conducted several weather reconnaissance missions into the storm. At the time, Uleki displayed a well-organized, tight circulation. The hurricane meandered in the same general area over the next two days, executing several small loops, with a slight northward drift. During this time, its circulation increased in coverage but became less-organized as weakening ensued. Increased wind shear and restricted outflow took their toll on the hurricane. Uleki passed roughly halfway between Johnston Atoll and the French Frigate Shoals on September 5. By September 7, the weakened trend halted and environmental conditions favored reintensification.

At 00:00 UTC on September 8, the CPHC transferred warning responsibility of Uleki to the Joint Typhoon Warning Center (JTWC) and the storm was subsequently referred to as a typhoon. Transfer of warnings occurred when the storm was at 178°W rather than at the dateline, where the boundary between the Central and West Pacific basins exists, for unknown reasons. Three hours later Uleki made its closest approach to Midway Atoll, passing  to the south. Shortly thereafter the system crossed the International Date Line and the Japan Meteorological Agency (JMA) also began advising on the system. Uleki maintained this strength through September 10 as it continued on its west-northwest course. On that day, the typhoon again entered a region of weak steering currents between two anticyclones within the subtropical ridge. A trough approaching from the west was forecast to prompt Uleki to turn east; however, the typhoon maintained a general northwest motion in a stair-stepped fashion. Increasing wind shear and cooler air soon imparted weakening, and Uleki degraded to a tropical storm by September 12.

Continued effects from shear stripped the cyclone of all deep convection, and by September 14 only a band of cirrus clouds remained in association with Uleki. The JTWC issued their final warning on the system at 00:00 UTC that day accordingly. The JMA maintained the system as a tropical depression as the former typhoon began turning to the east. Uleki later transitioned into an extratropical cyclone on September 16 as it accelerated to the east. The system dissipated the following day near the International Date Line, far from any major landmasses.

Preparations and impact
As the hurricane stalled to the southwest of Hawaii on September 3, tropical storm watches were issued for Oahu, Kauai, and Niihau. High surf advisories were raised for all islands as well. Following Uleki's turn to the west on September 5, the tropical storm watches were discontinued. The storm's erratic movement proved to be troublesome for forecasters and they continuously warned residents to be cautious and alert should the storm double-back to the state. On September 4, lifeguards at Waikiki Beach and Ala Moana Beach rescued 19 people caught in  swells. Further north in Oahu, two people drowned after being caught in rough waters.

The storm moved roughly halfway between the French Frigate Shoals and Johnston Island on September 5 with no adverse effects in either region due to its weakened state. On September 7, the 300 residents of Midway Atoll and United States Coast Guard personnel stationed on Kure Atoll prepared for possible hurricane-force winds from the storm. Some breaking waves spilled onto the runway at Henderson Field.

See also

Hurricane Keoni (1993) – A similarly long-lasting and intense hurricane that also took a similar track
List of Hawaii hurricanes
1988 Pacific hurricane season

Notes

References

Category 3 Pacific hurricanes
1988 Pacific hurricane season
Hurricanes in Hawaii
1988 in Hawaii
Tropical cyclones in 1988